Steve Hinton is an American aviator who held a world speed record from 1979 to 1989 and won six Unlimited-class air races, including two national championships. He won four consecutive Unlimited races in one year, and remains the only pilot ever to do so. He retired from racing in 1990. His son, Steven Hinton Jr., became the youngest pilot to win the Reno Air Races Unlimited-class championship in 2009 at the age of 22. Steve is the president of Planes of Fame Air Museum with locations in Chino, California and Valle-Grand Canyon, Arizona, and owner of Fighter Rebuilders, a military aircraft restoration company.

On August 14, 1979, Hinton set the piston-driven aircraft 3-kilometer world speed record at 499.018 mph in the highly-modified RB51 Red Baron at Tonopah, Nevada, making Hinton, age 27, the youngest person ever to capture the speed record.

On September 16, 1979, Hinton was racing the RB-51 in Reno when the plane suffered catastrophic engine failure. Hinton finished the race in second place, but crashed short of the runway. Although the plane's fuel erupted in a fireball, the cockpit was thrown away from the fire and Hinton survived with a broken back, leg, and ankle.

In 1980, Hinton married Karen Maloney. Karen is the daughter of Steve's friend, air racing legend Ed Maloney.

Hinton became the chief test pilot for the Tsunami Racer in 1987.

Some of Hinton's notable wins in air racing include:
 1978, Mojave, Red Baron
 1978, Reno (Unlimited National Champion), Red Baron
 1979, Miami, Red Baron
 1979, Mojave, Red Baron
 1985, Reno (Unlimited National Champion), Super Corsair
 1990, Sherman, Texas, Tsunami

Hinton is a member of the Screen Actors Guild and charter member of the Motion Picture Pilots Association. He has worked on more than 60 films. In 2002 he received a nomination from the World Stunt Awards for the Taurus Award, Best Aerial Work in Pearl Harbor.

See also
 Fastest propeller-driven aircraft

References

Living people
1979 in aviation
Air racers
1952 births
American aviation record holders